The Young Generation Network, or YGN, is a branch of the Nuclear Institute founded in 1996. It is a British version of the European Young Generation Network created earlier in Sweden by Jan Runermark, a president of ABB Atom who had been concerned with preserving the know-how of retiring nuclear-energy pioneers and who perceived a need for greater efforts to retain young professionals. The YGN, which is open to NI members under the age of 37, organizes lectures, speaking competitions, and facility tours for new nuclear workers in Great Britain. It also conducts its own lobbying efforts, serves as a source for journalists seeking information about the nuclear-industry labour market and promotes careers in science and engineering in schools, colleges and universities.

The UK's objectives are based on those established by the European Nuclear Societies, which are to:

 focus on the next generation
 promote knowledge in a wide perspective of the nuclear industry
 transfer the 'know-how' within generations
 provide a platform for:
- personal networks
 
- exchange of experience

- exchange of best practice across companies

- development of nuclear technology

- recruitment and job opportunities

- career development.

Chairs

 Mike Roberts 2019
 Rob Ward 2020
 Hannah Paterson 2021

Notes

External links
YGN - The NI YGN website, contains lots of information on the work of the YGN and links to useful sites
Nuclear Institute
Nuclear Industry Association - Trade association and information body for the UK civil nuclear industry
European YGN links

References
1 YGN Aims
2 Objectives for a Young Generation Network

Nuclear industry organizations